Pati Regency (ꦥꦛꦶ) is a regency in the northeastern region of Central Java Province, on the island of Java in Indonesia. The regency covers an area of 1,503.68 km2, on the coast of the Java Sea. It had a population of 1,193,202 at the 2010 Census and 1,324,188 at the 2020 Census, comprising 660,484 males and 663,704 females. The administrative capital of Pati Regency is the town of Pati.

Administrative districts
The Regency comprises twenty-one districts (kecamatan), tabulated below with their areas and their populations at the 2010 Census and the 2020 Census. The table also includes the number of administrative villages (rural desa and urban kelurahan) in each district and its post code.

Tourism

Natural tourism 

Pati has a natural tourist attractions, namely:

 Arga Enchantment, in Beketel Kayen Village
 Lake Terpus Beketel, in Beketel Kayen Village
 Grenjengan Sewu Waterfall, in Jrahi Village
 Rainfowl Waterfall, in Sukolilo Village
 Grenjengan Seno Waterfall, in Payak, Cluwak, Pati
 Wareh Cave, in Kedumulyo Kayen Village
 Pancur Cave, in Jimbaran Kayen Village
 Lotus Swamp in Pengging Wangi, Kasiyan
 Klating Waterfall, in the village of Mojoagung / dukuh Klating
 Bukit Pandang Ki Santa Mulya, in Durensawit Kayen Village
 Seloromo Reservoir, in Gembong Village
 Plorodan Semar Waterfall, in Sumbersari, Kayen

Historical tour 

Pati has historical sights, namely:

 Mosque Agung Pati, in the village of Puri
 Majapahit Gate, in Muktiharjo / Rendole Village
 Petilasan Syech Jangkung, in the village of kayen
 Genuk Kemiri (Raden Kembang Joyo Relics), in Hamlet Kemiri, Kalidoro Village

Family tour 
Pati has tourist attractions for families, namely:

Family tour:

 Juwana Water Fantasy, in Bumimulyo Village 
 Juwana Byar-Byur Water Park, in Winong Village
 Sendang Tirta Marta Sani, in Tamansari Village
 TPA Pati Zoo, in Banyuurip Village

Religious tourism 
Pati has pilgrimage places, namely:

 Tomb of Nyai Ageng Ngerang, in Tambakromo Village
 Tomb of Sheikh Jangkung (Saridin), Landoh Village
 Tomb of Mbah Tabek Merto, in Prawoto Village
 Tomb of Sheikh Ahmad Mutamakkin, in Kajen Village
 Tomb of KH. Abdullah Salam (Mbah Dullah), in Kajen Village
 Tomb of KH. Sahal Mahfudz, in Kajen Village
 Tomb of KH. Suyuthi Abdul Qadir, in Guyangan Village, Trangkil
 Tomb of Sunan Ngerang (Guru Sunan Muria), in Hamlet Ngerang, Trimulyo Village
 the tomb of Sunan Makhdum (Sayyid Abdurrahman Al-Makhdum) The leader of Walisongo I, in Parenggan Village, Pati Kota
 Tomb of Syeh Ronggo Kusumo, in Ngemplak Kidul Village, Margoyoso
 Tomb of Sunan Prawoto (King of the Fourth Demak Kingdom), in Prawoto Village
 Tomb of Bandung Bondowoso Ratu Pengging,
 Tomb of King Prabu Dhling, in Hamlet Mlawat Baleadi
 Tomb of Mahapatih Batik Madrim, in Kedung Winong Village

Shopping tour 
Pati has a special tourist attractions shopping, namely:

 Ada Swalayan
 Luwes Mall
 Galaxy Swalayan
 Plasa pati
 Salsa Pati
 Borobudur Plaza pati
 Plaza Puri
 Surya baru Swalayan
 Pati Trade center
 Pasar Pargola (Pasar Pragolo) Mall and Resto, di Margorejo
 Plaza juwana
 Laris Toserba
 Pati Town Square
 Lippo Plaza Juwana
 Juwana Mega Plaza
 Kajar Trade Center
 Pasar Seleko Pati
 Pengging Wangi Trade Center
 Pengging Wangi Square

Potency 
In addition to the famous Bandeng Presto/Bandung Juwana, Pati is one of the two largest mangosteen producing districts in Central Java besides Cilacap.
 Cashew Industrial Center, in Margorejo village.
 Mangosteen Center, in Jepalo and Gunungsari Villages
 Brass Craft, in Juwana Village
 Cow milk business, in Sukoharjo Village
 Salt Industry, in District Batangan
 Trangkil Sugar Factory, in Trangkil Village
 New Pakis Sugar Factory, in Pakis village
 Cassava kripik with various flavours, in Banyuurip village
 Kapuk randu Industry, in Karaban Village, Gabus District.
 The center of rice and green beans, in Jambean Kidul Village, Margorejo Pati.
 Coffee Plantation, in Jrahi Village, Gunungwungkal and Sitiluhur
 Tapioca Flour Industry, in Ngemplak Village, Margoyoso
 Batik Bakaran Industrial Fabrics, in Bakaran Village, Juwana
 Brick Industry, in Trangkil Village
 Shrimp paste Industry, in Juwana Village, Margoyoso and Tayu

Achieved Achievement Pati 
Regency of starch is not only famous as mina tani earth city, on the other hand Pati also has many achievements that have been achieved because of performance and effort from government, also Pati own community which have work ethic and ability that rarely known by people around. Achievements achieved by Pati include:

 Langse village, Margorejo sub-district, was chosen to represent Pati Regency to become Energy Self-Reliance Village of Central Java Province. Reactor "Submarine" thus the name of the installation of waste processing equipment rabbit, goat and others - the bio-gas and fertilizer plants produced by local residents.
 Starch Entrance 13 districts in Indonesia that have 100% Apply Siskudes. Pati District three times consecutively get Unqualified Opinion (WTP) from the Audit Agency (BPK) Representative of Central Java Province.
 Student of Melati Alfatannafiah from Muhammadiyah Elementary School Representing Indonesia to International Mathematics Competition appointed by Director General of Primary and Secondary Education of Kemendikbud RI to represent Indonesia in Bulgarian International Mathematics Competition (BIMC) competition in Burgas, Bulgaria.

Education

SMA / SMK 

SMA / SMK in Pati Regency is as follows:
 MA Abadiyah, in Gabus District
 MA Al-Hikmah, in Margoyoso District
 MA Al-Ikhlas, in Tlogowungu District
 MA As-Salamah, in Pati District
 MA Bustanul Ulum, in Wedarijaksa District
 MA Darul Falah, in Cluwak District
 MA Darul Ulum, in Jaken District
 MA Darul Ulum, in Tlogowungu District
 MA I'anatut Tholibin, in Margoyoso District
 MA Ihya'ul Ulum, in Wedarijaksa District
 MA Khoiriyah, in Margoyoso District
 MA Khoiriyah, in Gembong District
 MA Khoiriyatul Ulum, in Trangkil District
 Ma Madarijul Huda, in Dukuhseti District
 MA Manabi'ul Falah, in Margoyoso District
 MA Manahijul Hyda, in Dukuhseti
 MA Manba'ul Ulum, in Pati District
 MA Matholi’ul Falah, in Margoyoso District
 Matholi’ul Falah, in Juwana District
 Matholi’ul Huda, in Pucakwangi District
 Matholi’ul Huda, in Trangkil District
 MA Miftahul Falah, in Talun Kayen
 MA Miftahul Huda, in Tayu District
 MA Miftahul Ulum, in Tambakromo
 MA Miftahul Ulum, in Trimulyo Kayen
 MA Miftahut Thulab, in Sukolilo District
 MA Misbahul Ulum, in Pasucen Trangkil
 MA Mujahidin, in Gembong
 MA Muwahidin, in Gembong
 MA Negeri 1 Pati, in Margorejo
 MA Negeri 2 Pati, in Kecamatan Tayu
 MA NU Bageng, in Gembong
 MA Nurul Hikmah Banyuurip, in Banyu urip Village
 MA Nurul Quran, in Pucakwangi District
 MA PGIP Hadiwijaya, in Margoyoso
 MA PPKP Darul Ma’la, in Winong District
 MA Raudlotusy Syubban, in Winong District
 MA Raudlotut Tholibin, in Tayu District
 MA Salafiyah, in Tlogowungu
 MA Salafiyah, in Margoyoso
 MA Silahul Ulum, in Trangkil
 MA Sirojul Anam, in Tayu District
 Sirojul Huda, in Kayen District
 MA Sultan Agungm in Sukolilo District
 MA Sunan Muria, in Cluwak
 MA Sunan Prawoto, in Sukolilo District
 MA Tarbiyatul Banin, in Winong District
 MA Tarbiyatul Banin Banat, di Dukuhseti
 MA Tarbiyatul Islamiyah, in Pucakwangi District
 MA Thoriqotul Ulum, in Wedarijaksa
 MA Walisongo, in Kayen District
 SMA Bokpri 1,in Pati
 SMA Bokpri 3,in Dukuhseti
 SMA Cadangan, in Pati
 SMA Dharma Putra, in Pati
 SMA Islam Raudlotul Falah, in Gembong
 SMA Islam Tuan Sokolangu, di Gabus
 SMA IT Yaumi Fatimah, in Pati
 SMA Joyo Kusumo, in Pasuruhan Kayen Village 
 SMA Kesuma, in Margoyoso
 SMA Muhammadiyah 01,in Kecamatan Pati
 SMA Muhammadiyah 02,in Sukolilo District
 SMA Muhammadiyah 03,in Sukolilo District
 SMA Muria, in Margorejo
 SMA Nasional, in Pati District
 SMA PGRI 1, in Pati
 SMA PGRI 2, in Kayen
 SMA PGRI 3, in Tayu
 SMA Rifaiyah, in Kayen District
 SMA Taman Madya, in Juwana District
 SMA Wahid Hasyim, in Pati
 SMA Yos Soedarso, in Pati
 SMAN 1 Batangan, in Batangan
 SMAN 1 Jakenan, in Jakenan District
 SMA 1 Juwana, in Juwana District
 SMAN 1 Kayen, in Kayen
 SMAN 1 Pati, in Pati
 SMAN 1 Tayu, in Tayu
 SMAN 2 Pati, in Pati District
 SMAN 3 Pati, in Pati
 SMK Al Falah, in Winong District
 SMK An Najah, in Kayen District
 SMK Assalamah, in Pati
 SMK Bahtera, in Pati
 SMK Bani Muslim, in Pati
 SMK Bina Tunas Bangsa, in Juwana District
 SMK Cordova, in Kajen Village
 SMK Farming, in Tlogowungu
 SMK Gajah Mada 01,in Margoyoso District
 SMK Gajah Mada 02, in Pati
 SMK Kesuma, in Margoyoso
 SMK Mambaul Huda, in Dukuh Seti
 SMK Muhammadiyah 01, in Pati
 SMK Muhammadiyah 02, in Tayu
 SMK Nahdlotul Ulama, in Gembong
 SMK Nasional, in Pati
 SMK Pelayaran, in Tayu
 SMK Permata Nusantara, Jl. Raya Gabus Pati, KM 0,5 Gabus
 SMK Salafiyah Margoyoso, in Desa Kajen
 SMK Taruna Bangsa, in Gabus
 SMK Telkom Terpadu AKN Marzuqi, in Pati District
 SMK Tunas Harapan, in Pati
 SMKN  1 Pati, in Pati
 SMKN 2 Pati, in Pati
 SMKN 3 Pati, in Pati
 SMK Sultan Agung, in Sukolilo

College / University 

Universities / Colleges in Pati Regency are among others as follows :
 Sekolah Tinggi Agama Islam Pati (STAIP) Address: Jl Kampus Raya No. 5 Margorejo Pati Jateng
 College of Informatics and Computer Management (STIMIK) AKI Pati, Address: Jl Kamandowo Number 13 Pati
 Christian Religion College (STAKWW) Pati, Address: Jl P Diponegoro Number 33 Pati
 Mathali'ul Falah Islamic College (STAIMAFA) Pati, Address: Jalan Raya Pati-Tayu Km 20 Kelurahan Purworejo District Margoyoso Pati
 Midwifery Academy (Akbid) Bakti Utama Pati, Address: Jalan Ki Ageng Selo Number 15, Blaru, Pati, Central Java
 Midwifery Academy (Akbid) Duta Dharma Pati, Address: Jalan Panglima Sudirman Number 1B Pati, Central Java
 Akademi Keperawatan (Akper) Pragola Pati, Address: Jalan Banyu Urip Raya Number 26A, Margorejo, Pati
 Agricultural Academy Pragola Pati, Address: Jalan Rendole Number 1 Pati
 Open University (UT) Pati, Address: Jalan Raya Semarang-Kendal Km 14,5 Mangkang Wetan, Semarang

Radio and TV Broadcasting Institutions

Radio 
list of Radio in Pati is as follows:
 Radio Suara Pati FM Jl. P. Tombronegoro No.1 Pati
 Pt. Radio BOSWIN/ Radio Boswin FM Jl. Pati-Gabus No.1 Pati
 PT. Radio HARBOS / Radio Harbos FM Jl. Raya Pati-Gabus No. 1A
 PT. Radio Pati Adi Suara/ Radio PAS FM Jl. P. Sudirman Km 3 Pati
 PT.RADIO SESANTI MANDIRI/ Radio POP FM Jl Banyuurip Km 3 Margorejo, Pati
 PT. RADIO PRAGOLA/ Radio BEST FM Jl Banyuurip Km 3 Margorejo, Pati
 PT.RADIO PESANTENAN/ Radio PST FM Jl. Syeh Jangkung No.164 Pati
 Radio Swara Juana Sakti FM Jl. Sunan Ngerang No. 2A Juwana
 Radio Foster FM Jl. RA Kartini No.03
 Radio  ISMA  FM KH. Mansyur Ds. Kauman Rt 01/02 Pati
 Radio Komunitas Kristen Elshaday Radio Komunitas Kristen Elshaday
 PT. Radio Cendekia Winong/ Radio Cendekia FM Jl. Raya Jakenan- Winong Km. 05 Pati
 PT. Radio Ndholo Kusumo/ Radio Ndholo Kusumo FM Ds. Margoyoso RT.02 Rw. II Kec.

TV 

List of TVs in Pati include the following:
 Kartika TV Jl. Dr Wahidin Ruko Salza No. 15-16 Pati
 TV Simpanglima address Perum Gunung Bedah Jl. P Sudirman Km.5 Pati
 PT. Merdeka Sarana Media / SM TV address Jl. Raya Pati-Kudus Km. 4  Pati
 Kudus Televisi Indonesia address GriAlamat Griya Kencana 2 jl. Gaharu raya no. 48 kel. Sidokerto Pati
 ANTV Pati  address Pati
 Viva Sport    Indonesia 1 address Pati
 TV One Pati address Jl. Dr. Susanto 98 Parenggan Pati
 Lingkar TV address Jl. Dr Wahidin No. 2 Pati Lor Kec. Kota Pati Kab. Pati

Health

Hospital 

 RS Kristen Tayu
 RSUD RAA Soewondo
 RS Keluarga Sehat Hospital (KSH)
 RS Mitra Bangsa
 RS Fastabiq
 RSB Harapan
 RSB Asifa
 RS Paru-paru
 RS Islam Pati
 RS Assuyuthiyyah Guyangan
 RSU Kayen
 RS Internasional Pengging Wangi (Tahap perencanaan)

Clinic 
 Klinik Sejahtera
 BKIA Bhayangkari
 Klinik Keluarga Sehat

Puskesmas 

 SUKOLILO I 	  jl. Raya. Sukolilo, Kec.Sukolilo	 
 SUKOLILO II	  Sunan Prawoto, Kec.Sukolilo		
 KAYEN		  Pati Purwadadi, Kec.Kayen		
 TAMBAKROMO	  Jl. Raya Gabus Kayen, Kec.Tambakromo	 
 WINONG I	  Jl. Raya Winong, Kec.Winong		 
 WINONG II	  Danyang Mulyo, Kec.Winong		
 PUNCAKWANGI I	  Ds. Puntadewa, Kec. Puncakwangi	 
 PUNCAKWANGI II  Ds. Tegalwero, Kec.Pucakwangi		
 JAKEN		  Jaken Jakenan, Kec.Jaken			
 BATANGAN	  Juana Rembang, Kec.Batangan		
 JUWANA	  Kihajar Dewantara, Kec.Juwana		
 JAKENAN	  Ds. Dukuhmulyo, Kec. Jakenan		 
 PATI I	  Jl. Supriyadi No. 51, Kec. Pati		
 PATI II	  Jl. Raya Pati Tayu, Kec. Pati			
 GABUS I	  Ds. Gabus Tlogo Ayu, Kec.Gabus	
 GABUS II	  Pati Kayen, Kec.Gabus			
 MARGOREJO	  Jl. Raya Pati Kudus, Kec. Margorejo		
 GEMBONG	  Jl. Raya Gembong, Kec.Gembong		
 TLOGOWUNGU	  Jl. Raya Patitlogowungu 61, Kec.Tlogowungu	
 WEDARIJAKSA I	  Ds. Wedarijaksa, Kec. Wedarijaksa		
 WEDARIJAKSA II  Ds. Sidoarjo, Kec.Wedarijaksa		
 TRANGKIL	  Ds. Trangkil, Kec. Trangkil			
 MARGOYOSO I	  Jl. Kyai Cebolang No. 16, Kec.Margoyoso	
 MARGOYOSO II	  Jl. Raya Pati Tayu, Kec.Margoyoso		
 GUNUNG WUNGKAL  Tayu Gunung Wungkal, Kec. Gunungwungkal	
 CLUWAK	  Ds. Plaosan, Kec. Cluwak			
 TAYU I	  Jl. Sudirman 17, Kec.Tayu			
 TAYU II	  Ds. Pundenrejo, Kec.Tayu			
 DUKUHSETI	  Ds. Alas Dowo, Kec.Dukuhseti

References
2. Kabupaten Pati Dalam Angka 2017

Java Sea